Guajiboan (also Guahiban, Wahívoan, Guahiboan) is a language family spoken in the Orinoco River region in eastern Colombia and southwestern Venezuela, a savanna region known as the Llanos.

Family division

Guajiboan consists of 5 languages:
 Macaguane (also known as Hitnü, Macaguán, Makawane, Agualinda, Agualinda Guahibo, Támude)
 Southwest Guajiboan
 Guayabero (also known as Cunimía, Mítiwa, Mitúa, Mitu, Hiw, Jiw, Wayavero, Guaviare)
 Churuya (also known as Bisanigua, Guaigua) (†)
 Central Guajiboan
 Guajibo (also known as Guahibo, Sikuani, Sicuani, Chiricoa, Hiwi, Jiwi, Jivi, Wahivo, Wahibo, Guaybo, Goahibo, Guaigua, Guayba, Goahiva)
 Waü (west)
 Newütjü (also known as Tigrero)
 Parawá (east)
 Hamorúa (also known as Amorúa, Jamorúa)
 Dome (also known as Playero, Cajaro)
 Cuiva (also known as Wamonae, Cuiba, Kuiba, Deja, Cuiba-Wámonae)
 Pimenepiwi (Meta river)
 Aitopiwi (Ariporo river)
 Yaraüraxi (Capanaparo river)
 Waüpiwi (also known as Wipiwi, Yomati)
 Siripuxi (also known as Tsiripu, Siripu)
 Mayaraxi (also known as Mariposo, Mayalero)

Churuya is now extinct. It was formerly spoken in Meta, Colombia.

Macaguane is listed as a dialect of Guajibo in Kaufman (1994) and Campbell (1997). Gordon (2005) lists Playero (also Rio Arauca Guahibo), a dialect of Guajibo, as a separate language with a "low intelligibility of other Guahibo".

Guajibo and Cuiva form a dialect continuum.

Guajibo has the most speakers (over 23,000) and is the largest indigenous group in eastern Colombia. Approximately 9,000 in Venezuela.

Guayabero is the most divergent language of the family.

Genetic relations
Guajiboan has often been grouped together with Arawakan, Arauan, and Candoshi by many classifiers. However, this now seems unlikely as the similarity between Guajiboan and Arawakan has been attributed to language contact.

Language contact
Jolkesky (2016) notes that there are lexical similarities with the Yanomami, Arawak, Nadahup, Puinave-Kak, Bora-Muinane, and Choko language families due to contact.

Meléndez-Lozano (2014) has also noted that Guahiban has borrowed from Arawakan languages, especially the Achagua and Piapoco languages.

An automated computational analysis (ASJP 4) by Müller et al. (2013) found that there are apparent lexical similarities with Yanomami and Ticuna-Yuri. However, since the analysis was automatically generated, the similarities could be either due to mutual lexical borrowing, genetic inheritance, or chance resemblances.

Proto-language

Below are Proto-Guahiban reconstructions by Christian and Matteson (1972):

References

Bibliography

 Adelaar, Willem F. H.; & Muysken, Pieter C. (2004). The languages of the Andes. Cambridge language surveys. Cambridge University Press.
Berg, Marie L. and Isabel J. Kerr. (1973) The Cuiva language: Grammar. Language Data, Amerindian Series, 1. Santa Ana, CA: Summer Institute of Linguistics.
 Campbell, Lyle. (1997). American Indian languages: The historical linguistics of Native America. New York: Oxford University Press. .
 Greenberg, Joseph H. (1987). Language in the Americas. Stanford: Stanford University Press.
 Kaufman, Terrence. (1990). Language history in South America: What we know and how to know more. In D. L. Payne (Ed.), Amazonian linguistics: Studies in lowland South American languages (pp. 13–67). Austin: University of Texas Press. .
 Kaufman, Terrence. (1994). The native languages of South America. In C. Mosley & R. E. Asher (Eds.), Atlas of the world's languages (pp. 46–76). London: Routledge.
 Keels, Jack. (1985). "Guayabero: Phonology and morphophonemics." In Ruth M. Brend (ed.), From phonology to discourse: Studies in six Colombian languages: 57-87. Language Data, Amerindian Series, 9. Dallas: Summer Institute of Linguistics.
 Queixalós, Francisco. (1988). "Presentación"; Diccionario sikuani–español: i-xiii. Bogotá: CCELA Universidad de los Andes. ISN 0121-0963. 
 Rivet, Paul (1948) "La famille linguistique Guahibo"; Journal de la Société des Américanistes XXXVII: 191-240. Paris.

External links

 Proel: Sub-Familia Guajiboana

 
Language families
Indigenous languages of the South American Northeast
Macro-Arawakan languages